Francis E. Kelly (March 26, 1903 – January 27, 1982) was an American politician who served as a member of the Boston City Council from 1930 to 1933, the 53rd Lieutenant Governor of Massachusetts from 1937 to 1939 and Massachusetts Attorney General from 1949 to 1953. He was an early and perennial advocate of a public lottery, and acquired the nickname "Sweepstakes Kelly."

References

1903 births
Massachusetts Democrats
Massachusetts Attorneys General
Boston City Council members
Lieutenant Governors of Massachusetts
1982 deaths
20th-century American lawyers
20th-century American politicians